"Love Long Distance" is a song by American band Gossip, released as the second single from their album Music for Men. It was released on September 13, 2009, in the United States. It quotes the refrain from the song "I Heard It Through the Grapevine" by Marvin Gaye.

Track listings
Australian CD single
 "Love Long Distance" (radio edit) – 3:39
 "Love Long Distance" (Fake Blood Remix) – 4:36
 "Love Long Distance" (Riva Starr Remix) – 5:56
 "Love Long Distance" (Riva Starr Radio Edit) – 3:34

European CD single
 "Love Long Distance" – 4:24
 "Love Long Distance" (Fake Blood Remix) – 4:36

Charts

References

2009 singles
2009 songs
Columbia Records singles
Gossip (band) songs
Song recordings produced by Rick Rubin
Songs written by Beth Ditto
Songs written by Brace Paine
Songs written by Hannah Blilie